Ebermannstadt station is a railway station in the town of Ebermannstadt, located in the Forchheim district in Upper Franconia, Germany.

References

Railway stations in Bavaria
Railway stations in Germany opened in 1892
1892 establishments in Bavaria
Buildings and structures in Forchheim (district)